Roberto Alarcón may refer to:

 Iván Romero (footballer, born 1980), Spanish football left-back
 Iván Romero (footballer, born 2001), Spanish football forward for Sevilla